MCMC may refer to:

 Malaysian Communications and Multimedia Commission, a regulator agency of the Malaysian government
 Markov chain Monte Carlo, a class of algorithms and methods in statistics

See also
 MC (disambiguation)
 MC2 (disambiguation)